Presbyterian Senior High School is a Presbyterian coeducational first-cycle institution in Akuapim-Mampong in the Eastern Region of Ghana. It is situated northeast of Tutu, close to Mampong Akwapim Senior High/Technical School for the Deaf.

The school runs courses in Business, Science, General Arts, General Agriculture, Home Economics and Visual Arts, leading to the award of a West African Senior School Certificate (WASSCE).

History 
A community-based institution school that was established in 2002 by the Presbyterian Church of Ghana. The general objective of its establishment was to provide full secondary school education to the growing number of boys and girls, especially those resident around the Akuapem North and South community.

The school runs both day, boarding and hostel system with majority of the students in the boarding house.

The schools colors are Blue and white. The school has on the grounds of Presbyterian discipline trained a lot of diligent men and women in godliness, good character and responsible.

Enrollment 
The school has about 2,500 students enrolled in Business, Science, general arts, general agric, Home Economics and visual arts courses.

Facilities 

 3 Science Laboratories ( Physics, Biology and Chemistry)
 I.C.T Lab
 Library
 Home Economics Lab
 Visual Arts Center
 School Farm
 Sports (standard field for soccer and athletics, basketball court, volley and handball court)
 School Clinic
 Barbering shop

See also 

 Education in Ghana
 List of senior high schools in Ghana

References 

2002 establishments in Ghana
Education in the Eastern Region (Ghana)
Educational institutions established in 2002
High schools in Ghana
Christian schools in Ghana